Koh-Lanta: La Légende is the twenty-seventh season and seventh special season of the French reality television series Koh-Lanta. This season brings back 21 All Star players to commemorate the 20th anniversary of the show with the contestants living in harsher conditions than previously seen on the show whilst trying to survive each other and win €100,000.

The main twist this season is when contestants are voted out, they are not eliminated from the game. They are sent to the Isle of the Banished where they'll live with other eliminated contestants and compete against each other until only two remain. The two left on the Isle will return to the game at the merge.

The season premieres on 24 August 2021 on TF1. For the first time since Le Retour des Héros, the show will air every Tuesday. The season concluded on 14 December 2021 where Claude Dartois gained 9 jury votes against Laurent Maistret who received 4. However, due to Dartois and Maistret's cheating that was discovered after filming, Dartois lost his title as Sole Survivor and the €100,000 prize with the money being donated to a charity in remembrance of Les 4 Terres, Bertrand-Kamal Loudhriri who died of cancer.

Contestants

Challenges

Voting history

Notes

References

External links

French reality television series
Koh-Lanta seasons
2021 French television seasons
Television shows filmed in French Polynesia